Seward Township may refer to:

Illinois
 Seward Township, Kendall County, Illinois
 Seward Township, Winnebago County, Illinois

Indiana
 Seward Township, Kosciusko County, Indiana

Kansas
 Seward Township, Seward County, Kansas, in Seward County, Kansas

Minnesota
 Seward Township, Nobles County, Minnesota

Oklahoma
 Seward Township, Logan County, Oklahoma, in Logan County, Oklahoma

See also
Seward (disambiguation)

Township name disambiguation pages